Sloanea is a genus of flowering plants in the family Elaeocarpaceae, comprising about 150 species.

Species include:

 Sloanea acutiflora Uittien
 Sloanea assamica Rehder & E. Wilson
 Sloanea australis Benth. & F.Muell., an Australian rainforest tree
 Sloanea berteroana Choisy ex DC.
 Sloanea caribaea Krug & Urb. ex Duss
 Sloanea gracilis Uittien
 Sloanea lepida Tirel
 Sloanea shankii Standl. & L.O.Williams
 Sloanea suaveolens Tirel
 Sloanea tomentosa Rehder & E. Wilson
 Sloanea woollsii F.Muell., an Australian rainforest tree

Fossil record
†Sloanea olmediaefolia has been described from many fossil leaves collected from lower Oligocene strata from 1857 to 1889 in Santa Giustina and Sassello in Central Liguria, Italy. Fossil leaves of this species have also been collected from the continental (fluvial and limnic) beds of the Csatka Formation near Oroszlány (western Hungary, northeastern Transdanubia); these beds are from the 34 million years old Oligocene regional stage Kiscellian.

References

External links
 Elaeocarpaceae At: 

 
Elaeocarpaceae genera
Taxonomy articles created by Polbot